Buena Vista is an unincorporated community located along Richland Creek in Stephenson County, Illinois at latitude 42.426 and longitude -89.678. The elevation is 797 feet. Buena Vista is in Orangeville Community School District. The Jane Addams bike trail passes through Buena Vista.

References

Unincorporated communities in Stephenson County, Illinois
Unincorporated communities in Illinois